The Ethics Matters is a TV series on applied ethics and political philosophy, aired on ABC television in Australia. All episodes are also available online. The series was awarded the Media Prize of the Australasian Association of Philosophy in 2018.

Production
 Presenter: Dan Halliday
 Podcast Co-Presenter: Christian Barry
 Director: Catherine Gough-Brady
 Essayist: Brigid Evans
 Producer: Snodger Media

References

External links
Ethics Matters

2010s Australian television series
Philosophy television series
Australian Broadcasting Corporation original programming
Applied ethics
Political philosophy